

References

Lists of medical abbreviations